WQMP (101.9 FM) is a radio station licensed to Daytona Beach serving the Orlando and Space Coast areas of Central Florida. Owned by Audacy, Inc., it broadcasts an alternative rock format branded as "FM 101.9". Its studios are located in Maitland and the transmitter is in Orange City. To the north, the station can be heard as far as St. Augustine, to the south, the station can be heard as far as Palm Bay and is one of the few Orlando stations that covers Ocala.

History

Early years
The 101.9 frequency began as WMFJ-FM on November 1, 1967. Sister to AM 1450 in Daytona Beach, WMFJ-FM was an automated beautiful music station known as Stereo 102.  The station's calls were changed to WQXQ in 1973, and the format became automated Album Oriented Rock as Q102. Despite the rock format's success, management felt that a top 40 hit station would have more mass appeal, and so Q102 changed from rock to Top 40 in 1976; initially the station remained automated, but by the end of the 1970s it employed a staff of live and local announcers. The station changed its calls to WDOQ in 1980, but the format remained top 40, the moniker remained Q102, and the ratings remained high. Due to new competition in the Daytona market from WNFI in 1982, Q102 began to more aggressively target the Orlando market as opposed to only Daytona Beach. Although plans for a big 100,000-watt signal that would have extended to St. Augustine, Gainesville and Ocala were scrapped, WDOQ's listenership continued to grow.

In 1984, WDOQ was sold and adopted the new calls WCFI, with a satellite-fed adult contemporary format from Transtar (now Dial Global), using the I-4 (a tribute to Miami's WINZ-FM) and later Sunny 102 monikers. In 1985, the station was purchased by Duffy Broadcasting for $7.7 million. On June 16, 1986, the format and calls changed again to WORZ, Z-102FM, a classic rock station. In 1987, it was sold to Beasley-Reed Broadcasting for $9.2 million.

102 Jamz
On April 1, 1988, the call letters were changed to WJHM, and the station adopted a CHR/Urban format targeting a multicultural audience as 102 Jamz under the direction of Program Director Duff Lindsey and consultant Jerry Clifton. The station was an immediate success with listeners and within two years, ascended to the top of the 12+ Arbitron Ratings. Some of the DJs included Joe Nasty doing mornings, Magic Scott (now Cadillac Jack in Philadelphia) doing afternoons, and Cedric Hollywood as mid-day jock (also Music Director). WJHM was purchased by Chancellor Media in 1997.  In late 1998, longtime music director Cedric Hollywood, who had been with the station since its inception in 1988, left "102 Jamz" to go to WEDR in Miami. Soon after, it started adding urban based songs to its playlist. Although the station was labeled as "Rhythmic", WJHM remained an Urban station at its core, but would later drop rhythmic-based songs when it got competition when WCFB acquired an urban AC format, resulting in WJHM shifting to urban altogether.

The late 1990s brought a time of mergers with Chancellor merging with Evergreen and forming AMFM, Inc., who hold ownership of WJHM until it merged with Clear Channel in 2000. To comply with FCC ownership rules, Clear Channel sold WJHM to Infinity Broadcasting (later CBS Radio) in 2001. It briefly reverted to rhythmic by 2005 to go up against WPYO, although this was unsuccessful due to WCFB (WPYO's sister station) having almost no competitor during the rhythmic experiment. WJHM shortly reverted to urban to challenge WCFB. Given WJHM's Urban heritage status in Orlando, it was in competition with both WCFB and WPYO (both owned by Cox Radio). Although it was one of the top ranking radio stations in the market, WJHM suffered the rare setback of ranking behind WPYO in the Arbitron ratings, rare to have an Urban format rank behind a Rhythmic.

In the fall of 2011, WJHM began adding Rhythmic product again. Despite its continued urban contemporary tenure per Nielsen BDS reports rather than being a rhythmic, it continued on Mediabase's rhythmic panel during this tenure. Since the shift back to Rhythmic, WJHM added more pop tracks, such as You Make Me Feel... by Cobra Starship & Moves Like Jagger by Maroon 5. This move was due to WJHM looking at challenging WXXL, the market's only Top 40/CHR and former sister station. However, Cox-owned WPYO, whose Rhythmic direction slightly favored hip hop but whose playlist was almost identical to WJHM, continued to surpass WJHM in the ratings.  In late January 2012, WJHM made more changes by dropping Rickey Smiley's syndicated morning show in favor of a more music-intensive morning block, terminated 18-year air-staffer Jay Love from the roster, and began transitioning to a rhythmic top 40 direction altogether, as their playlist began including artists like Jessie J, Avicii, Kelly Clarkson, fun., The Wanted, and Adele. It also dropped their longtime slogan "Non-Stop Hip-Hop and R&B", replacing it with "102 Minutes of Commercial-Free Music". The non-urban content that WJHM plays also receives airplay at both WXXL and adult top 40 WOMX, WJHM's sister station. By February 22, 2012, the station completed the shift to Rhythmic Top 40, joining the market's existing rhythmic WPYO as Nielsen BDS moved it to the Top40/Rhythmic panel citing a low emphasis on urban contemporary tracks and since making the transition adding more Pop tracks. Along with these changes, it dropped the Sunday morning gospel programming syndicated from WVEE, although WJHM's HD2 subchannel broadcasts a Gospel format full-time.

Between 2000 and early 2012, WJHM was one of CBS Radio's only young demographic-targeting Urban stations along with Atlanta's WVEE-FM and Charlotte's WPEG, although all of them are in the southern United States. Its sister station WPGC-FM in Washington, D.C.–Baltimore, Maryland was an urban contemporary reporter per Nielsen BDS and CBS Radio from 1997 to 2012, while they reported to the rhythmic contemporary panel at Mediabase, due to being a hybrid of both formats (also known as "Churban"), despite Radio One having WKYS and WERQ-FM directly competing in the area. WPGC returned to the BDS Rhythmic reporting panel in June 2012.

101-9 AMP Radio

On February 11, 2014, in the early morning hours, WJHM dropped the "Jamz" branding after 26 years and began stunting with a loop of the song "Get Lucky" by Daft Punk featuring Pharrell Williams and Nile Rodgers. At 10:19 that morning, WJHM rebranded as 101.9 AMP Radio and shifted to top 40/CHR altogether, putting it in line with CBS Radio's "AMP Radio" branding, which favors rhythmic pop and dance hits. The first song on "AMP Radio" was "Timber" by Pitbull featuring Kesha. Despite the rebranding, WJHM continued to lag in Arbitron ratings behind CHR competitor WXXL and rhythmic CHR station WPYO.

On January 20, 2016, WJHM changed its call letters to WQMP to match the "AMP Radio" branding.

On February 2, 2017, CBS Radio announced it would merge with Entercom. The merger was approved on November 9, 2017, and was consummated on November 17.

Alt 101-9/FM 101-9
On November 29, 2017, at 3 p.m., after playing “End Game” by Taylor Swift, WQMP flipped to alternative rock as Alt 101-9, joining several other former "AMP Radio"-branded stations in switching to the format and brand after the completion of the Entercom merger. The change brought the format back to a full-market signal in Orlando for the first time since 2008, when sister station WOCL flipped to classic hits. The first song on Alt was "Smells Like Teen Spirit" by Nirvana. The most recent analog broadcast station to air the format full-time, Cox Media's W297BB/WCFB-HD2, was aired on a translator and an HD sub-channel, and aired from June 2014 to January 2016. Elsewhere in the Orlando market, iHeartMedia's talk-formatted WTKS-FM features alternative on nights and weekends, and is also aired on two HD subchannels in the Orlando market, WOCL HD2 and WJRR HD3, the latter of which also uses the brand Alt as standardized by iHeartMedia; this name conflict resulted in WQMP quietly changing its on-air brand to FM 101-9 on December 4 that year. 

In September 2020, most of the local DJs and programming staff were laid off and replaced by out-of-market programming.

HD Radio subchannels

WQMP-HD2
WQMP activated its HD2 subchannel at the same time it started its HD radio operations at some point in the mid-2000s, which originally carried an urban gospel format, branded as "102 Gospel Jamz", from the 2000s until 2018. In August 2019, WQMP-HD2 was supposed to flip to "Channel Q", an LGBTQ-oriented talk/dance music format based in Los Angeles. Since the HD2 stream did not appear on the station, it was placed on the HD2 subchannel of sister station WOMX-FM in early November 2019. The HD2 stream then reappeared later in 2020 carrying an alternative format featuring new releases, known as "Orlando’s New Arrivals". On February 23, 2022, WQMP-HD2 flipped to The Bet.

WQMP-HD3
As of July 2019, WQMP-HD3 was carrying a Haitian format from an unknown source. The HD2 and HD3 subchannels were removed around early 2020. In late 2020, the HD3 subchannel reappeared and became the new home for "Channel Q" in Orlando after being dropped by WOMX-FM’s HD2 subchannel at some point in early-to-mid 2020. In January 2022, “Channel Q” returned to WOMX-HD2, which led to the HD3 subchannel becoming a secondary feed for Audacy’s New Arrivals. The HD3 subchannel has since been turned off.

References

External links

1967 establishments in Florida
Radio stations established in 1967
Modern rock radio stations in the United States
QMP
Audacy, Inc. radio stations